Charles Harold Clifford Rowe (14 June 1882 – 1 October 1959) was an Australian rules footballer who played with St Kilda in the Victorian Football League (VFL).

He died, at his Essendon residence, on 1 October 1959.

Notes

External links 

1882 births
1959 deaths
Australian rules footballers from Victoria (Australia)
St Kilda Football Club players